Everlasting may refer to:

 Everlasting life, the concept of physical or spiritual immortality

Plants

Everlastings (or everlasting daisies, or paper daisies), species in a group of genera in the family Asteraceae, including;

 Antennaria (North America and other northern hemisphere areas)
 Chrysocephalum (Australia)
 Coronidium (Australia)
 Edmondia (South Africa)
 Gamochaeta (North and South America)
 Helichrysum (Africa, Madagascar, Australasia and Eurasia)
 Ozothamnus (Australia)
 Phaenocoma (South Africa)
 Rhodanthe (Australia)
 Syncarpha (South Africa)
 Xeranthemum (Southern Europe)
 Xerochrysum (Australia)

Plants in the genus Limonium (family Plumbaginaceae), in particular Limonium perezii, are referred to as everlastings in South Africa.

Music

Albums
 Everlasting (Every Little Thing album), 1997
 Everlasting, a 2006 instrumental work by Robin Guthrie
 Everlasting (Natalie Cole album), 1987, or the title song
 Everlasting (Martina McBride album), 2014
 Everlasting (EP), a 1994 EP by Refused

Songs
 "The Everlasting" (song), a 1998 single by Manic Street Preachers
 "Everlasting" (BoA song), a 2006 single by BoA
 "Everlasting", a 2007 song by Galneryus from  the album One for All – All for One
 "Everlasting", a 2012 song by Matt Brouwer from the album Till the Sunrise

Others
 Everlasting, the official fan club of the South Korean pop girl group Brown Eyed Girls
 The Everlasting (role-playing game), a role-playing game
 Everlasting, the fictional TV series that is the subject of Unreal (TV series)
 Everlasting (film), a 2016 suspense film by Anthony Stabley
 Everlasting (food), a Filipino pork meatloaf

See also
 Everlast (disambiguation)